The consensus 1968 College Basketball All-American team was determined by aggregating the results of four major All-American teams.  To earn "consensus" status, a player must win honors from a majority of the following teams: the Associated Press, the USBWA, The United Press International and the National Association of Basketball Coaches.

1968 Consensus All-America team

Individual All-America teams

AP Honorable Mention:

Joe Allen, Bradley
Butch Beard, Louisville
Tom Boerwinkle, Tennessee
Mike Casey, Kentucky
Don Chaney, Houston
Russ Critchfield, California
Tom Hagan, Vanderbilt
Shaler Halimon, Utah State
Bill Hewitt, Southern California
Simmie Hill, West Texas
Bill Hosket, Ohio State
Harry Hollines, Denver
Merv Jackson, Utah
Bill Justus, Tennessee
Willie McCarter, Drake
Jim McKean, Washington State
Jim McMillian, Columbia
Ron Nelson, New Mexico
Bob Portman, Creighton
Charley Powell, Xavier (LA)
Bill Schutsky, Army
Lynn Shackelford, UCLA
Don Smith, Iowa State
George Thompson, Marquette
Rich Travis, Oklahoma City
Ron Williams, West Virginia

Academic All-Americans
On April 28, 1968, CoSIDA announced the 1968 Academic All-America team.  The following is the 1967–68 Academic All-America Men's Basketball Team as selected by CoSIDA:

See also
 1967–68 NCAA University Division men's basketball season

References

NCAA Men's Basketball All-Americans
All-Americans